Jean-Claude Ruiz (30 November 1954 – 21 February 2021) was a French boxer. He competed in the men's light welterweight event at the 1976 Summer Olympics. At the 1976 Summer Olympics, he lost to Calistrat Cuțov of Romania.

References

1954 births
2021 deaths
French male boxers
Olympic boxers of France
Boxers at the 1976 Summer Olympics
AIBA World Boxing Championships medalists
Light-welterweight boxers
People from Orne